The Walsh Act is a legislation in the U.S. state of New Jersey that permits municipalities to adopt a non-partisan commission form of government. The legislation was signed by Governor of New Jersey Woodrow Wilson on April 25, 1911. The commissions in Walsh Act municipalities are composed of either three or five members elected for four-year concurrent terms. The commissioners also serve as department heads in addition to their legislative functions. The commissioners elect one commissioner as mayor, who serves as chair of the commission. With few exceptions, Walsh Act mayors have no powers over and above their fellow commissioners, and are only responsible for their specific department(s).

The Walsh Act was modeled on the commission system that was set up in Galveston, Texas in the wake of the devastating Hurricane of 1900. As part of its reconstruction efforts, the city reorganized itself to a government system in which each elected official had a specific area of responsibility, combining executive and legislative responsibilities. The Walsh Act was enacted in 1911, and specified that commissioners would be elected at large in nonpartisan elections, and would serve four-year, concurrent terms of office. The Walsh Act was the first charter law in New Jersey to include options for ballot initiatives, referendums and recall.

The popularity of the Walsh Act form of government declined from a peak of about 60 in the early years after it was created to a total of approximately 30 statewide in 2018, of which six in North Jersey and the remainder are largely in Jersey Shore communities.

Municipalities with a five member commission

These communities have five commissioners: 
Commissioner of Public Affairs
Commissioner of Public Safety
Commissioner of Public Works
Commissioner of Parks and Public Property
Commissioner of Revenue and Finance

Municipalities with a three member commission

These communities have three commissioners: 
Commissioner of Public Affairs and Public Safety
Commissioner of Public Works, Parks and Public Property
Commissioner of Revenue and Finance

See also
1923 Municipal Manager Law

References

External links
The Commission Form of Municipal Government (PDF)
A History of Municipal Government in New Jersey Since 1798 (PDF)

 
Local government in New Jersey
1911 in American law
1911 in New Jersey
Local government legislation
History of local government in the United States